Robert Nicholas (22 April 1758 – 27 December 1826) was an English politician.

Life and career 
Robert Nicholas was born on 22 April 1758. He was the member of Parliament for Cricklade in Wiltshire from 4 April 1785 to March 1790. He was Commissioner of Excise from 1790 to 1822 and chairman of the Board of Excise from 1802 to 1822. He died on 27 December 1826, aged 68.

Personal life 
He married firstly Charlotte Frankland, daughter of Sir Thomas Frankland, 5th Baronet, by whom he had issue 5 sons and 6 daughters. His daughter Harriet Nicholas married another MP. His son William was an officer in the Royal Engineers.

References 

Members of Parliament for Cricklade
1758 births
1826 deaths
Commissioners of Excise
English barristers